Bernard Guerrien is a French economist and the author of La Théorie des jeux (2002), Dictionnaire d'analyse économique (2002), and La théorie économique néoclassique. macroéconomie, théorie des jeux, tome 2 (1999).

He is the starting force behind the Post-autistic economics movement that began in France.

Publications

Articles

 Putting an End to the Aggregated Function of Production... Forever?
 Is There Anything Worth Keeping in Standard Microeconomics?
 A Reply to Katzner and Case
 Fama-Shiller, Economic Sciences Prize Committee and the "Efficient Markets Hypothesis"
 Efficient Markets Hypothesis: What Are We Talking About?
 Is There Something to Expect from Game Theory?
 Competition and Zero Profit: A Big Mess. On the Inconsistencies of the Neo-classical Theory of Income Distribution

References

Related links
 Bernard Guerrien's internet site
 Autisme-Economie.org Website of the French students movement for a reform of the teaching in economics (English section)
 Petition that started the PAE movement in 2000
 Post Autistic Network

French economists
Year of birth missing (living people)
Living people